Magdalene or Magdalen may refer to:

Mary Magdalene, a disciple of Jesus
Magdalene (given name), a feminine given name (and list of persons with that name)
Magdalen College, Oxford, a constituent college of the University of Oxford
Magdalene College, Cambridge, a constituent college of the University of Cambridge
Magdalen Islands, an archipelago in Quebec, Canada
Magdalene asylum or Magdalene Laundries, Catholic institutions for “fallen women”
Magdalene (comics), a Marvel Comics character
Magdalene (sculpture), an outdoor sculpture by Dessa Kirk in Chicago, Illinois, US
Magdallan, later known as Magdalen, an American metal band
Magdalene (album), a 2019 album by FKA Twigs
 "Magdalene", a song by Lenny Kravitz from Circus
 "Magdalene", a song by White Zombie from Let Sleeping Corpses Lie
 Magdalene Catholic High School, in Smeaton Grange, New South Wales, Australia
Wiggenhall St Mary Magdalen, Norfolk.

See also
Madeleine (disambiguation)
Magdalen College (disambiguation)
Magdalena (disambiguation)